Syndactyla is a genus of foliage-gleaners, birds in the ovenbird family Furnariidae.

Taxonomy
The genus Syndactyla was introduced in 1853 by the German naturalist Ludwig Reichenbach to accommodate the buff-browed foliage-gleaner. The name combines the Ancient Greek sun meaning "together" with daktulos meaning "toe". Members of this genus are most closely related to the foliage-gleaners in the genus Anabacerthia.

Species
The genus contains eight species:

 Lineated foliage-gleaner, Syndactyla subalaris
 Guttulate foliage-gleaner, Syndactyla guttulata
 Buff-browed foliage-gleaner, Syndactyla rufosuperciliata
 Rufous-necked foliage-gleaner, Syndactyla ruficollis
 Planalto foliage-gleaner, Syndactyla dimidiata 
 Tepui foliage-gleaner, Syndactyla roraimae (formerly placed in Automolus)
 Peruvian recurvebill, Syndactyla ucayalae 
 Bolivian recurvebill, Syndactyla striatus

References

 
Bird genera
Taxonomy articles created by Polbot
Taxa named by Ludwig Reichenbach